Nobbys Head Light is an active lighthouse on Nobbys Head, a headland on the south side of the entrance to Newcastle Harbour, New South Wales, Australia. An image of the lighthouse is included in the Coat of Arms of the City of Newcastle.

The lighthouse is operated by the Newcastle Port Corporation. The headland is managed by the Land Property Management Authority and is open to the public Sundays from 10am to 4pm.

History

The island was reduced in height to improve the sailing conditions and to accommodate a lighthouse and signal station, built in 1858. The lighthouse was designed by Alexander Dawson, the New South Wales Government Architect. The original light had an intensity of 20,000 cd and was attended by three lighthouse keepers.

In 1934 the light was electrified and automated.

Currently at the site are three one-story keeper's houses, a three-story signal station, and other buildings housing the port watch. The entire station is floodlit at night.

Heritage listing
On 22 June 2004, the lighthouse and associated structures were registered on the Commonwealth Heritage List.
On 21 October 1980, the lighthouse was listed on the (now defunct) Register of the National Estate.

Gallery

See also

 List of lighthouses in Australia

Notes

References

External links

Lighthouses completed in 1858
Lighthouses in New South Wales
1858 establishments in Australia
Commonwealth Heritage List places in New South Wales
Buildings and structures in Newcastle, New South Wales